Bajtek is one of the first popular magazines devoted to computer science in Poland. Its title was an reference to the computer term byte and to the American magazine Byte. The founder was Waldemar Siwiński. The magazine was very well-known in the late 1980s in the country. It was published between 1985 and 1996. The magazine was inspired by the British magazine Your Computer and the American magazine Compute!. The sponsor of Bajtek was Polish Socialist Youth Union which is also known is ZSMP.

References

External links
 

1985 establishments in Poland
1996 disestablishments in Poland
Defunct computer magazines
Defunct magazines published in Poland
Magazines established in 1985
Magazines disestablished in 1996
Magazines published in Poland
Polish-language magazines